Luojiang District (Pe̍h-ōe-jī: Lo̍k-kang) is a district of Quanzhou, Fujian province, People's Republic of China.

Administrative divisions
Subdistricts:
Wan'an Subdistrict, Shuangyang Subdistrict

Towns:
Heshi, Majia, Luoxi

The only township is Hongshan Township

References

Quanzhou
County-level divisions of Fujian